Lancea is a plant genus in the recently described Mazaceae. It had formerly been tentatively included in the lopseed family, Phrymaceae as well as the Scrophulariaceae.

Species
Lancea species include:
Lancea tibetica 
Lancea hirsuta

References

Mazaceae
Lamiales genera